Double Shot may refer to:

 Bubble Bobble Double Shot, a 2007 video game
 Double Shot (ride), a type of amusement ride manufactured by S&S Power
 Double-Shot, a 1966 album by Chet Baker and the Mariachi Brass
 Double Shot!, a 2000 album by Snooky Pryor and Mel Brown
 Double-shot running deer, a discontinued ISSF shooting event
 Doubleshot, a 2000 spy novel
 Doubleshot (coffee), an espresso extracted using a double filter basket in the portafilter
Double Shot, a 1988 avant-garde single by The Residents

See also

 Double-shotted